The Old Mississippi State Capitol, also known as Old Capitol Museum or Old State Capitol, served as the Mississippi statehouse from 1839 until 1903.  The old state capitol was added to the National Register of Historic Places in 1969.  In 1986, the structure was designated a Mississippi Landmark and became a National Historic Landmark in 1990.

History

Construction
Although construction was initiated in 1833, there were problems with the architect and substandard materials.  The original architect, John Lawrence, was replaced in 1836 by William Nichols, who oversaw completion of the 3-story structure in 1840.

The exterior of the building was composed of brick, limestone, and stucco. Wood was the principal material used for construction of the building's interior, with the exception of brick partition walls and flagstones on the rotunda floor.

Occupancy
From 1839 until 1903, as Mississippi's statehouse, the old capitol was the site of several historical legislative events:
 Passage of an ordinance of secession in 1861.
 Constitutional Convention of 1865.
 Constitutional Convention of 1868, recognizing African American political rights.
 Restoration of white rule in 1875.
 Constitutional Convention of 1890, under which Mississippi is still governed.

When construction of a newer state capitol was completed in 1903, the old capitol building was abandoned and remained so until 1916, when it was renovated for state office space.
By 1960, all state agencies had vacated the structure and it was again renovated to become the State Historical Museum in 1961.

In August 2005, winds from Hurricane Katrina peeled off sections of the old capitol's copper roof.  About four weeks later, rain from Hurricane Rita infiltrated the building and damaged ceilings, walls, and ornamentation, as well as historical artifacts.  Storm repairs and renovations were completed between 2007 and 2009, and the museum reopened to the public.  The Old Capitol Museum is administered by the Mississippi Department of Archives and History.

Gallery

See also
Perry Cohea

References

External links

 Old Capitol Museum, at Mississippi State Department of Archives and History

National Historic Landmarks in Mississippi
Museums in Jackson, Mississippi
Former state capitols in the United States
History museums in Mississippi
Government buildings completed in 1839
William Nichols buildings
Mississippi Landmarks
National Register of Historic Places in Jackson, Mississippi
1839 establishments in Mississippi